Zoran Ivanović (born 1967) is a Serbian sculptor and a professor at the Serbian Academy of Applied Arts. He is the creator of numerous monuments in Serbia and Europe.

References

External links 
 Page on Academy of Applied Arts website
 zoransculptor.com

1967 births
Serbian sculptors
Male sculptors
Living people